A registered Thoroughbred mare, Lena's Bar (1954–1969) raced on the Quarter Horse racetracks and was the dam of Jet Smooth, Double Dancer and Easy Jet, three outstanding Quarter Horse stallions.

Life

A Thoroughbred daughter of the stallion Three Bars, Lena's Bar was out of Lena Valenti, a granddaughter of Percentage. Thus, Lena's Bar had Percentage, Three Bar's sire, on both sides of her pedigree. Lena Valenti raced on the Quarter tracks, ending with a record of two starts, one win, one third with an AA speed rating.

Racing career 
Lena's Bar raced mainly in Quarter Horse races.<ref name=Legends2>Simmons, et al. Legends 2 pp. 170–177</ref> She started seventy-six times, winning twenty-four races. She placed second eighteen times and was third ten times. Her total earnings were $28,308.00 with 67 racing points with the American Quarter Horse Association (or AQHA). She rated an AAA speed rating in those races, and was a stakes race winner. She once outran Go Man Go, Double Bid, Tidy Too, Miss Louton, Vandy's Flash and Vanetta Dee in one race. Her sister Little Lena's Bar set four world records at four different distances.

 Breeding record 
After Lena's Bar retired from racing, she produced the Quarter Horse stallions Double Dancer, Jet Smooth, and Easy Jet, along with two Quarter Horse mares – Delta Ann and Mayflower Ann. Her offspring earned $557,199.00 on the track, with all five being winners and Register of Merit earners. Lena's Bar died in 1969.

Lena's Bar was inducted into the AQHA's Hall of Fame in 2003.

Pedigree

Notes

References

 All Breed Pedigree Database Pedigree of Lena's Bar accessed on June 26, 2007
 AQHA Hall of Fame'' accessed on September 1, 2017

External links
 Lena's Bar at Quarter Horse Directory
 Lena's Bar at Quarter Horse Legends

1954 racehorse births
1969 racehorse deaths
American Quarter Horse racehorses
Racehorses bred in Oklahoma
Racehorses trained in the United States
American Quarter Horse broodmares
Thoroughbred family 11
AQHA Hall of Fame (horses)